Burkina Faso competed at the 2000 Summer Olympics in Sydney, Australia.

Athletics

Men
Track & road events

Women
Track & road events

Boxing

Judo

References
Official Olympic Reports

Nations at the 2000 Summer Olympics
2000
Oly

ru:Верхняя Вольта на летних Олимпийских играх 1972